Sidney Carroll Miller (born September 6, 1955) is an American politician from Stephenville, Texas. He is the Texas Agriculture Commissioner, serving since January 2015. He is a Republican.

From 2001 to 2013, Miller served in the Texas House of Representatives for District 59 in central Texas, being unseated in the Republican runoff election held on July 31, 2012, by physician J. D. Sheffield.

He is known for his promotion of right-wing conspiracy theories and falsehoods.

Early life and education
Miller was born in De Leon, Texas. He graduated from De Leon High School. He received an Associate of Arts degree from Cisco Junior College and in 1978, received a Bachelor of Science in Vocational Agriculture Education from Tarleton State University.  He operates a successful agricultural business known as Miller Nursery where he grows trees, shrubs and decorative plants near Stephenville, Texas.

Texas House of Representatives
Miller was first elected to the House in 2000, when he unseated the Democratic incumbent David Lengefeld (born 1945) of Hamilton County, 18,566 (54.4 percent) to 15,561 (45.6 percent). He was the only Republican in Texas that year to unseat a Democratic lawmaker.

In 2003 and 2007, Miller introduced bills to legalize the export of horse meat from Texas for human consumption abroad. The bill would have repealed a 1949 state law that prohibits the sale or transport in Texas of horsemeat intended for human consumption. Neither measure was enacted; the legislation passed the House in 2003, but died in a Senate committee, while the 2007 measure never made it out of a House committee.

In 2011, Miller authored House Bill 15, a measure to require a woman to undergo a sonogram prior to procuring an abortion. Miller's official biography states that the bill was "the strongest sonogram law in the nation" and received the support of Texas Right to Life and other anti-abortion groups. He has twice received the "Fighter for Free Enterprise" Award from the Texas Association of Business. Phyllis Schlafly's Eagle Forum, operated in Texas by Cathie Adams, former state chairman of the Texas Republican Party, named Miller the "second most conservative" member of the legislature.

In 2011, Miller authored legislation (dubbed the "Pork Chopper Bill") that allowed licensed hunters to contract with landowners to shoot feral hogs and coyotes on their property via helicopter.

The conservative Miller was unseated in the Republican runoff election held on July 31, 2012, by osteopathic physician J. D. Sheffield of Gatesville in Coryell County. In 2013, two complaints filed against Miller with the Texas Ethics Commission alleged campaign finance irregularities and failure to disclose loan repayments from his campaign.

Ethics Commission cases 
Beginning in 2013, the Texas Ethics Commission has investigated four ethics complaints against Miller filed by attorney Mark McCaig.

"Frustrated with the commission's lag time in resolving the issues," McCaig withdrew the complaints in a 2016 letter. Nevertheless, the Commission continued investigating, and dismissed one complaint in December 2016.<ref>David Saleh Rauf, Ethics commission dismisses complaint over Sid Miller campaign loan, San Antonio Express-News (December 22, 2016).</ref> In June 2017, the Commission resolved two of the complaints, sanctioning Miller for improper accounting in reporting political contributions and expenditures and fined him $2,750. Miller's spokesman characterized the investigation as "nothing more than a politically motivated witch hunt" over "very minor technical issues."

Texas Agriculture Commissioner

2014 election

With 411,560 (34.6 percent) of the ballots cast, Miller led a five-candidate field for agriculture commissioner in the Republican primary held on March 4, 2014. Tommy Merritt, Miller's former House colleague from Longview, finished second with 249,440 votes (21 percent). The three losing primary candidates, Eric Opiela, Joe Cotten, and Mayor J. Allen Carnes of Uvalde, held a combined 44 percent of the vote. In the runoff election held on May 27, 2014, Miller defeated Merritt, 362,573 votes (53.1 percent) to 320,434 (46.9 percent). In the general election, Miller defeated Democratic nominee Jim Hogan of Cleburne, an insurance salesman who ran a low-profile campaign. Miller received 2,693,466 votes (58.6 percent) to Hogan's 1,694,059 (36.8 percent). Two other candidates held the remaining 4.6 percent of the ballots cast. Miller gained national attention and scrutiny when he hired Ted Nugent as treasurer and co-chairman of his campaign.

2018 election

On November 13, 2017, Miller announced he would seek re-election in 2018. He won the March 6, 2018, Republican primary with about 56% of the vote, defeating two challengers. Miller won the general election, defeating Kim Olson.

 2022 election campaign 
Miller considered challenging Governor Greg Abbott in the Republican primary in 2022, but in June 2021 he announced he would seek re-election to a third term as Ag Commissioner. He faces a primary challenge from State Representative James White, who announced his run for the Republican nomination for Ag Commissioner the same month.

Tenure
Miller took office on January 2, 2015. In his first official action as commissioner, Miller granted full amnesty to cupcakes at a press conference on January 12, 2015, in which he drew attention to a previous repeal of a ban on junk food in Texas schools. In Miller's first nine months in office, he awarded $413,700 in bonuses to 144 staffers. In 2016, the Austin American-Statesman reported that Miller awarded two newly created $180,000/year positions to political allies, both of whom Miller owed a combined $116,000 in campaign payments.

Operation Maverick
In 2015, the Texas Department of Agriculture under Miller launched "Operation Maverick", an effort to enforce consumer protection laws requiring Texas businesses to register scales used to buy or sell by weight with the agency. In the program's first fifteen months, some 1,000 retailers were "notified they need to register their scales, which, depending on the industry and type of scale, can cost anywhere from $12 to $400."

In 2017, following the initiative, the Texas Legislature passed a bill (approved by the House in a 146–1 vote and by the Senate in a 31–0 vote) to end the regulation of scales used by certain restaurants. Miller opposed this bill, calling it "horse hockey" and urging Governor Greg Abbott to veto it.Sid Miller, When it comes to barbecue, trust but verify, Texas Tribune (May 23, 2017).

Mississippi trip
In February 2015, Miller took a trip to compete in the Dixie National Rodeo in Jackson, Mississippi using Texas state funds. Miller's office initially defended the use of state funds, explaining that the commissioner intended to meet with Mississippi agriculture officials. When the meeting fell through, Miller reimbursed the state using campaign funds and $16.79 from his nursery's business account. In December 2018, the Texas Ethics Commission fined Miller $500 for the trip; a report released by the commission stated “No meetings besides the horse show appear on any official Texas Agriculture Department schedules,” and that Miller “has not adequately explained why he initially reimbursed the state with political funds before reimbursing his political account with personal funds."

School nutrition
Six months after taking office, Miller reversed a ban, instituted in 2004 by then-Agriculture Commissioner Susan Combs, on soft drinks and fried foods in public schools. Miller said that local school districts should have the freedom to make decisions regarding food choices for their schools. Eight of the state's ten largest school districts, including Dallas, Fort Worth, Fort Bend County, Austin, and Laredo, said that they would retain their local policies of providing nutritious foods and not serving soft drinks.Liz Crampton, Big Schools Don't Fry: Not All Districts Warm to Miller's Initiative, Texas Tribune (July 1, 2015). The move was criticized by nutritionists and experts in public health; a spokeswoman for Miller's department said that the policy change was intended "to be a symbolic move giving more control to schools, not a directive for districts to reinstall fryers or soda machines."

Farm Fresh Initiative
Shortly after taking office, Miller created the Farm Fresh Initiative (including Farm Fresh Fridays), a farm-to-table program for Texas schools. The initiative has led many school nutrition programs to expand the program beyond one day of the week.

Agriculture department fee increases
In October 2015, Miller directed the TDA to increase 117 agriculture-related fees effective January 1, 2017. In announcing the fee increases, Miller said the changes were necessary to recover regulatory costs. The fee increases were criticized by the San Antonio Express-News, which urged Miller to drop the fee increase and legislators to determine whether the department is underfunded. Early in 2017, Miller called for raising his agency fees by another $5 million after $11 million in increases in 2016 for higher costs of licensing, registration, and inspection. Miller called the proposed increase "essential money" to keep his department operating and blamed legislative cuts for the need for the higher fees. The fee increase proposals were criticized by some, such as Republican State Representatives Ron Simmons and Larry Gonzales.

In the first nine months of 2015, Miller awarded $413,700 in one-time cash bonuses to 144 Agriculture Department employees, more than any statewide elected official. The bonus awards were criticized by government watchdog groups because of Miller's proposal to raise $20 million in fees for licenses, registrations and other services, and because Miller had dubbed himself a "fiscal hawk".

In an editorial, the San Antonio Express-News questioned why Miller as a state House member voted against increased appropriations for the agriculture department but as commissioner sought additional revenue for the department. When a $50 million budget request submitted by Miller was rejected by lawmakers in 2015, the commissioner proposed higher fees for department certifications, inspections, and registrations, a proposal rejected by a bipartisan group of state legislators as well as the American Farm Bureau Federation and Lieutenant Governor Dan Patrick. Representative John Otto of Dayton, the chairman of the House Appropriations Committee, said that fee hikes could result in lost revenue to the department because farmers and ranchers may choose alternative services. In an editorial, The Express-News urged Miller to drop the fee increase and legislators to determine whether the department is underfunded.

War on credit card skimmers
Throughout 2016 and 2017, Miller carried out a "war on credit card skimmers". The inspection initiative was designed to fight the illegal practice of capturing (or skimming) credit card information from gas pumps. Miller appeared in a video with tips to avoid being skimmed; the initiative received national attention.

Oklahoma trip
In February 2015, Miller sought state reimbursement for expenses incurred on a trip to Oklahoma, saying that he had an appointment with Oklahoma legislators, a scheduled tour of the Oklahoma National Stockyards, and a meeting with Oklahoma's chief agriculture official. Miller stated that the travel was for a public business purpose based on a brief chat with state legislators at the Oklahoma State Capitol, but the legislators said that they did not invite Miller or expect him on the day in question, the president of the stockyards said that Miller did not go on tour, and Miller later acknowledged "that he requested the meeting with the Oklahoma agriculture official - and then did not show up."

The Houston Chronicle subsequently reported that during the trip, Miller visited a doctor in Oklahoma City to receive a "Jesus shot"—an injection administered consisting of Dexamethasone, Kenalog, and Vitamin B12 that is "administered only by a single Oklahoma City-area doctor who claims that it takes away all pain for life." Miller subsequently said that he had received the medication in the past to treat chronic pain, but declined "to confirm or deny whether he received the injection during the February 2015 trip." Miller later reimbursed the state $1,500. After an investigation, the Texas Department of Public Safety declined to pursue any charges against Miller.

Feral hogs
In 2017, Miller approved the statewide use of "Kaput Feral Hog Lure" —a bait containing the poison warfarin—in order to kill feral hogs, which have increased in population in Texas and other states. Miller said that the use of the substance would be a "major new weapon" against destructive feral hogs, stating: "I am pleased to announce that the ‘feral hog apocalypse’ may be within Texans' reach."Asher Price, Sid Miller to approve new technique for killing feral hogs: poison, Austin American-Statesman (February 20, 2017). The approval prompted criticism from members of the hunting community and others who opposed the introduction of a poison into the environment.David Sikes, Toxic solution to feral hog problem, Corpus Christi Caller-Times (March 1, 2017).

The hogs number perhaps two million and cause more than $50 million in annual damage. A judge in Austin halted Miller's proposal after Wild Boar Meats, a North Texas hog processor, sued on grounds that the poison may have unintended consequences. The San Antonio Express-News editorial board opposes the use of the poison due to the risk it could impact the food chain, taint hog meat used for pet food, and poison non-targeted wildlife such as deer.

Meanwhile, state Senator Kirk Watson of Austin and state Representative Lynn Stucky of Denton County, a veterinarian, filed legislation to refer the feral hog matter to a university study to determine the impact the poison would have on the land, agriculture, and hunters before the Miller plan could take effect.

Confederate license plates
In 2018, Miller wrote a letter in support a proposed Sons of Confederate Veterans Texas license plate that would glorify the Confederacy, and offered to sponsor the license plate. The group's proposal is a long-running controversy in Texas.

Other political activities

Role in Donald Trump's presidential campaign
In the 2016 presidential election, Miller was a key Texas supporter of Republican Donald Trump. A founding member of Trump's Agricultural Advisory Board, Miller spoke at a Trump rally at the Travis County Exposition Center in Austin in May 2016. In the campaign's final days, Miller made multiple appearances on the Fox News Channel in support of Trump, while Trump praised Miller and his "big, beautiful, white cowboy hat" at rallies.

After the November 2016 election, Miller was thought to be a possible Trump choice to join the Cabinet as U.S. Secretary of Agriculture. President Trump later appointed Georgia Governor Sonny Perdue as Secretary of Agriculture.

Social media controversies
In August 2015, Miller posted a cartoon on his Facebook page that suggested the United States should launch a nuclear attack on the Middle East. The text read: "Japan has been at peace with the US since August 9, 1945. It's time we made peace with the Muslim world." The background was of a nuclear explosion. Miller received harsh criticism for the post and eventually removed it, but he termed the cartoon "thought provoking" and vowed not to apologize for his action.

In December 2015, Miller wrote on his Facebook page, "If one more person says Happy Holidays to me I just might slap them. Either tell me Merry Christmas or just don't say anything," in a post accompanied by a picture of a cowboy on a steer in front of a sign saying "We will never take Christ out of Christmas". The post received backlash, in which critics claimed the post encouraged violence and ignored other holidays; the Texas Democratic Party responded to the post by saying "Happy Holidays".

In November 2016, a tweet appeared on Miller's official Twitter account calling Hillary Clinton as a "cunt"; the tweet was condemned by both Democratic and Republican officials. In a statement, Texas Governor Greg Abbott called the tweet "an embarrassment." The tweet was deleted within fifteen minutes. Miller apologized for the tweet. Miller's campaign at first blamed a hacker, and then a staff member. The campaign subsequently said that it had fired the employee responsible, saying that the individual was a "third-party vendor" hired to do social media.

In May 2019, Miller received backlash from Muslim groups after posts on Facebook and Twitter called for Austin Mayor Steve Adler to not attend a Ramadan event headlined by Rep. Ilhan Omar. Miller tweeted "I am shocked to learn that Austin’s Jewish Mayor Steve Adler plans to share the stage at an upcoming Ramadan dinner with controversial Minnesota Rep. Ilhan Omar. I urge him to cancel his dinner reservation!". Miller followed up with a Facebook post classifying Omar's remarks as "hate speech" and saying that "repeated attacks upon the Jewish State of Israel have no place in a city like Austin that prides itself on diversity and inclusiveness."

Promotion of false news stories
A Texas Tribune'' analysis of "a portion of Miller's social media history" from late 2014 to late 2016 identified ten instances in which Miller posted fake news—"demonstrably false, misleading or unsupported information"—to Facebook and Twitter. For example, in March 2015, Miller posted on his Facebook a fake photo of President Obama holding a Che Guevara T-shirt and labeled the president "disgraceful." In 2018, after learning that a photo Miller shared on Facebook - showing Whoopi Goldberg wearing a shirt depicting Donald Trump shooting himself in the head - was doctored, Miller's campaign spokesman, Todd Smith, said that “We post hundreds of things a week. We put stuff out there. We’re like Fox News. We report, we let people decide.”

In 2017, Miller posted on his campaign's Facebook page a story about two Texas hunters supposedly attacked while camping by Mexican illegal immigrants. In fact, a subsequent police investigation determined that the hunters had shot each other and falsely blamed it on border-crossers. Presidio County Sheriff Danny Dominguez, who investigated the shooting, suggested that Miller "needs to do his job and stick to that, and I'll do my job."

George Soros conspiracy theories 
In 2020, Miller shared George Soros conspiracy theories. Miller falsely claimed that Soros was paying protestors involved in protests over the murder of George Floyd.

2020 presidential election 
After Joe Biden's victory against Donald Trump in the 2020 presidential election, Miller repeated Trump's unsubstantiated claims of mass voter fraud.

False claims about 2021 Texas power outages 
In February 2021, while Texas was suffering power outages amid a snowstorm, Miller falsely claimed that wind power was primarily at fault for the power outages, and wrote that "We should never build another wind turbine in Texas."

Lawsuit vs. the U.S. Department of Agriculture 
In April 2021, Miller filed a lawsuit in his private capacity as a citizen and rancher against the U.S. Federal Government for provisions within the American Rescue Plan Act of 2021 for defining "socially disadvantaged farmers and ranchers" as people of color. Miller's filing asserted that the program wrongly excludes "white ethnic groups that have unquestionably suffered" and as such is unconstitutional. Lawyers for his case are seeking to make it a class-action suit. The suit is sponsored by America First Legal, a group founded by previous members of President Donald Trump's administration, most notably former senior advisor Stephen Miller.

Personal life
Miller and his wife, Debra, live in Stephenville; they have two sons. The Millers are active members of the Erath County Cowboy Church, where he is an elder. An avid rodeo participant, Miller holds nine world championship titles. According to his official biography, he is a member of the Houston Livestock Show and Rodeo, the Associated General Contractors of America, American Quarter Horse Association, and the American Nursery and Landscape Association.

Electoral history

References

External links

 

|-

1955 births
21st-century American politicians
Agriculture commissioners of Texas
Businesspeople from Texas
Cisco College alumni
Living people
Republican Party members of the Texas House of Representatives
People from De Leon, Texas
People from Stephenville, Texas
Roping (rodeo)
School board members in Texas
Tarleton State University alumni
Educators from Texas